This is a list of the Ukraine national under-21 football team results from 1992 to 2009 (Matches 1 – 162).

1990s

1992

1993

1994

1995

1996

1997

1998

1999

2000s

2000

2001

2002

2003

2004

2005

2006

2007

2008

2009

References 

1990s in Ukraine
2000s in Ukraine
Ukraine national under-21 football team